Gulfiya Raifovna Khanafeyeva (born on 12 June 1982) is a Russian hammer thrower of Tatar ethnicity.

Her international breakthrough came following her world record breaking throw of 77.26 metres from 12 June 2006 in Tula. She beat fellow Russian Tatyana Lysenko, however Lysenko threw 77.41 metres on 24 June in Zhukovsky to regain the world record. Later in 2006 Khanafeyeva won a silver medal with 74.50 metres at the 2006 European Championships, her first international medal.

In 2007 Khanafeyeva improved to 77.36 m.

She participated in the 2012 Summer Olympics in London but did not qualify for the finals.

Doping
In 2002 IAAF announced that Khanafeyeva had tested positive at the Russian Championships and that she had received a 3-month doping ban.

On 31 July 2008, Khanafeyeva was one of seven female Russian athletes suspended by the IAAF, due to doping test irregularities.

On 20 October 2008, it was announced that Khanafeyeva, along with 6 other Russian athletes would receive two-year doping bans for manipulating drug samples.

On 30 March 2017, she was disqualified, and her 2012 Olympics results were annulled, after her second probe came positive for banned substances. In February 2019, the Court of Arbitration for Sport handed her an eight-year ban for doping, starting from 6 January 2017.

International competitions

See also
List of doping cases in athletics
Doping at the Olympic Games
List of European Athletics Championships medalists (women)
Russia at the World Athletics Championships
Doping at the World Athletics Championships

References

External links

1982 births
Living people
Russian female hammer throwers
Olympic female hammer throwers
Olympic athletes of Russia
Athletes (track and field) at the 2012 Summer Olympics
Universiade medalists in athletics (track and field)
Universiade silver medalists for Russia
Medalists at the 2003 Summer Universiade
European Athletics Championships medalists
Russian Athletics Championships winners
World record setters in athletics (track and field)
Russian sportspeople in doping cases
Doping cases in athletics
Tatar people of Russia